Alakamisy Fenoarivo (Antananarivo) is a suburb and a rural commune in Analamanga Region, in the  Central Highlands of Madagascar. It belongs to the district of Antananarivo-Atsimondrano and its populations numbers to 22,529 in 2018.

This suburb is crossed by the National Road 1.

Bodies of Water
The Andromba River and Lake Lohazozoro.

References

Populated places in Analamanga